Olavi Elo (5 April 1913 – 13 April 1979) was a Finnish sports shooter. He competed at the 1936 Summer Olympics and 1948 Summer Olympics.

References

1913 births
1979 deaths
Finnish male sport shooters
Olympic shooters of Finland
Shooters at the 1936 Summer Olympics
Shooters at the 1948 Summer Olympics
Sportspeople from Pori